Davis Joseph (born July 31, 1963) is a Canadian cricketer. He is a right-handed batsman and a right-arm fast medium pace bowler. A surprising tail-end batsman, he can occasionally stick it out at number ten for the team, while keeping up a powerful bowling attack.

He was involved in the 2001 ICC Trophy and 2003 World Cup for Canada, and the 2002–03 Red Stripe Bowl, for which, against world-class batsmen, he bowled at an average of a mere 15. During the Commonwealth Games, he was revered for bowling out Sachin Tendulkar for just two runs.

He currently plays for Victoria Park Cricket Club in the Toronto and District league, but has not played for Canada since the 2003 World Cup. He did not participate in the 2007 World Cup.

He currently works as a Store Manager for Walmart Canada.

References

1963 births
Living people
Canadian cricketers
Canada One Day International cricketers
Commonwealth Games competitors for Canada
Cricketers at the 1998 Commonwealth Games
Grenadian emigrants to Canada
Grenadian cricketers
Black Canadian sportspeople